The 1960 DFB-Pokal Final decided the winner of the 1959–60 DFB-Pokal, the 17th season of Germany's knockout football cup competition. It was played on 5 October 1960 at the Rheinstadion in Düsseldorf. Borussia München Gladbach won the match 3–2 against Karlsruher SC, to claim their 1st cup title.

Route to the final
The DFB-Pokal began with 5 teams in a single-elimination knockout cup competition. There were a total of two rounds leading up to the final. In the qualification round, all but two teams were given a bye. Teams were drawn against each other, and the winner after 90 minutes would advance. If still tied, 30 minutes of extra time was played. If the score was still level, a replay would take place at the original away team's stadium. If still level after 90 minutes, 30 minutes of extra time was played. If the score was still level, a drawing of lots would decide who would advance to the next round.

Note: In all results below, the score of the finalist is given first (H: home; A: away; N: neutral).

Match

Details

References

External links
 Match report at kicker.de 
 Match report at WorldFootball.net
 Match report at Fussballdaten.de 

Borussia Mönchengladbach matches
Karlsruher SC matches
1959–60 in German football cups
1960
Sports competitions in Düsseldorf
20th century in Düsseldorf
October 1960 sports events in Europe